Shenipsit State Forest is a state forest located in northeastern Connecticut with 11 parcels scattered between the towns of Somers, Ellington, and Stafford. The forest's headquarters is home to the Civilian Conservation Corps Museum, which houses memorabilia from CCC camps throughout the eastern United States. The forest is managed for forestry products and offers various recreational pursuits.

Geography
The forest is located mainly within the Eastern New England Uplift and contains tracts along the eastern edge of the Connecticut River Valley. The forest floor is scattered with boulders and large rocks from the last ice age. Soapstone Mountain used to be the site of a soapstone quarry during the Colonial era.

Recreation opportunities
The Shenipsit Trail, which runs  from East Hampton to Somers, passes through the Shenipsit State Forest and passes over the summit of Soapstone Mountain. The summit has the only lookout tower in northeastern Connecticut. The original fire tower was removed in 1971. Various forest trails can be used for hiking, mountain biking, equestrian travel, and cross-country skiing.

References

External links
Shenipsit State Forest Connecticut Department of Energy and Environmental Protection
Shenipsit State Forest Map Connecticut Department of Energy and Environmental Protection

Connecticut state forests
Ellington, Connecticut
Somers, Connecticut
Stafford, Connecticut
Parks in Tolland County, Connecticut
Geography of Tolland County, Connecticut
Civilian Conservation Corps in Connecticut
Civilian Conservation Corps museums
Protected areas established in 1927
Museums in Tolland County, Connecticut
1927 establishments in Connecticut